Poloma castanea is a moth in the family Eupterotidae. It was described by Per Olof Christopher Aurivillius in 1901. It is found in South Africa.

References

Endemic moths of South Africa
Moths described in 1901
Eupterotinae